Lorenzo Civallero (born 8 August 1975) is a former Italian race walker who won two medals, one of these gold, at the Summer Universiade.

Achievements

See also
 Italian all-time lists - 20 km walk
 Italian team at the running events
 Italy at the IAAF World Race Walking Cup
 Italy at the European Race Walking Cup

References

External links
 

1975 births
Living people
Italian male racewalkers
Universiade medalists in athletics (track and field)
World Athletics Championships athletes for Italy
Universiade gold medalists for Italy
Universiade silver medalists for Italy
Athletics competitors of Centro Sportivo Carabinieri
Medalists at the 1999 Summer Universiade
Medalists at the 2001 Summer Universiade
20th-century Italian people